Live 2014 may refer to:

Ghost Stories Live 2014, album by Coldplay
Live 2014, album by Franz Ferdinand
Vamps Live 2014, album by The Vamps (British band)
Animelo Summer Live 2014, by Nana Mizuki